Bauddhayan Mukherji aka 'Buddy' (born 1 June 1973) is a national award winning Indian filmmaker based in Mumbai. He is the co-founder—along with this wife Monalisa—of Little Lamb Films, which has produced three feature films, Teenkahon, The Violin Player  and Manikbabur Megh (The Cloud & The Man) and one documentary short, Kiske Liye (Who Is This Women's Day For?); His forthcoming films include Marichjhapi  and The Bookkeeper's Wife.

Personal life
Bauddhayan Mukherji, popularly known as Buddy, is an Indian filmmaker known for his advertising films and indie features. He was born and brought up in Kolkata. His father Banaj Mukherji was a poet while his mother Mira Mukherji was a school teacher. 
 
At 11, he was gifted a copy of the book "Ekei Bole Shooting" (All About Shooting) written by Satyajit Ray. The book changed his life and Bauddhayan decided to become a filmmaker!

He studied in South Point School and later St. Xavier's College, Kolkata where he majored in Economics. Later he studied at the Clarion College of Communication, eastern India's first advertising college.

Bauddhayan lives in Mumbai with his wife Monalisa and daughter Aarsha.

Professional life
Bauddhayan Mukherji's work life began with Shyamanand Jalan's Kolkata based production house Audio Visual Arts and later he joined Black Magic Motion Pictures where he joined as the assistant director but rose up the ranks to become a partner of the company. He was part of the team that created Patalghar (The Underground Chamber) the cult Bengali film in 2002.
 
Today Bauddhayan runs his own production house called Little Lamb Films which he founded with wife Monalisa in 2007 and is considered a path breaker in Indian advertising filmmaking. He has directed more than 400 TVCs and has helped create brands like Procter & Gamble, Nokia, Unilever, Honda, GlaxoSmithKline, Coke, Colgate, Heinz, Johnson & Johnson, Hyundai Motor Company, to name a few.
 
In 2010, Bauddhayan directed the Bell Bajao campaign for Breakthrough which went on to win the prestigious Silver Lion at Cannes – the Oscars of advertising films. He also became the first Indian filmmaker to win two back to back One Show merits at New York and Spikes Asia Golds at Singapore. In 2015, the Haathipaon Mukt Bharat (Filaria Free India) campaign for Sabin Vaccine Institute landed him with another Silver Lion at Cannes Health. 
 
In 2013, Bauddhayan ventured into feature films and over the last few years has directed two of India's most awarded and internationally acclaimed indies under the banner of Little Lamb Films – Teenkahon (2014, Bengali, available on Amazon Prime) & The Violin Player (2016, Hindi, available on Netflix). These films have been screened at more than 85 film festivals across five continents. In 2015, Bauddhayan went on to win the Aravindan Puraskaram, an award by the Kerala State Chalachitra Academy for the Best Debutant Director in the country, for Teenkahon. The Violin Player also became the first Indian film ever to be represented by the French Sales Agents, Alpha Violet.

In 2021, Bauddhayan won his first National Award for The Shower - a PSA on the rural-urban water inequality for Unilever, India. The Shower became the first Indian advertisement film to win the National Award. It won the Best Promotional Film in non-feature film category at the 67th National Film Awards.
 
Marichjhapi, his next directorial venture for Little Lamb Films has already created a buzz in the international co-production market when it was chosen to represent India at the prestigious Asian Project Market at Busan 2019 and Cinéfondation L'Atelier at the Cannes Film Festival 2020. One of Bauddhayan's forthcoming directorial project, The Bookkeeper's Wife, was part of the Co-production Market at Film Bazaar 2020 and the Torino Film Lab NXT, 2021.

Festival circuit

References

External links
Little Lamb Films website
Bauddhayan Mukherji on afaqs

1973 births
Living people
Film directors from Kolkata
Bengali film directors